Chris Thomas Devlin is an American screenwriter best known for his work on Texas Chainsaw Massacre (2022) and Cobweb (2023).

Career 
In 2018, Devlin wrote an unsolicited screenplay for the horror film Cobweb (2023). The screenplay was included in 2018's Black List and Blood List. In November 2019, he gained notability when he was hired as a screenwriter on Texas Chainsaw Massacre (2022), which served as a direct sequel to the original film and ignored all other installments of the franchise. By November 2020, Lionsgate bought Devlin's screenplay for the horror film Video Nasty.

Filmography

References

External links 
 

21st-century American male writers
21st-century American screenwriters
American screenwriters
Living people
Year of birth missing (living people)